Events from the year 1752 in France

Incumbents
 Monarch – Louis XV

Events

Births
10 May – Pierre de Ruel, marquis de Beurnonville, military officer (died 1824).
20 August – Peter Ochs, French-born Swiss politician (died 1821)
21 August – Jacques Roux, priest (died 1794)
Precise date unknown – Pierre Joseph Bonnaterre, naturalist (died 1804).

Deaths
9 March – Claude Joseph Geoffroy, apothecary and chemist, 66
17 March – Jacques-Pierre de Taffanel de la Jonquière, Marquis de la Jonquière, admiral and governor, 66
14 June – Charles-Antoine Coypel, painter, 57
19 September – Louis Fuzelier, playwright, 80?

See also

References

1750s in France